Jamie Croft (born 4 August 1981 in Sydney) is an Australian actor of television and film and voice actor

Career

Television
Croft began his career in the television soap opera A Country Practice. Subsequent credits include: Police Rescue, Water Rats, Above the Law, Sun on the Stubble (aka The Valley Between) and Farscape.

Voice roles
Napoleon – Napoleon
Pixel Pinkie – Coolest Luke
Zigby – Clem and Stink
Sea Princesses – Caramello
The DaVincibles – Pablo and Mascot
Gumnutz: A Juicy Tale – Claude
Legend of Enyo – Enyo
The Wild Adventures of Blinky Bill – Bill Koala (Blinky's dad)

Film
He has also appeared in many movies and mini-series including, That Eye, The Sky, 20th Century Fox's Mighty Morphin Power Rangers: The Movie, The Real Macaw, Disappearance, Blurred, The Pact, was the voice as Napoleon in Napoleon and Hercules. Croft was one of the original hosts of Nickelodeon variety show Sarvo, alongside Josh Quong Tart.

Personal life
Croft is the brother of fellow actress Rebecca Croft.

In February 2008 he married his long-time girlfriend Saskia Burmeister. Their first son, Jackson Jay "JJ", was born in May 2012, and their second son, Bodhi Phoenix, was born in June 2014.

References

External links
 

1981 births
Male actors from Sydney
Living people
Australian male television actors
Blinky Bill